The 1970 Victorian state election, held on Saturday, 30 May 1970, was for the 45th Parliament of Victoria. It was held in the Australian state of Victoria to elect the 73 members of the state's Legislative Assembly and 18 members of the 36-member Legislative Council.

The incumbent Liberal government led by Henry Bolte was returned for a sixth term with a slightly reduced majority.

Results

Legislative Assembly

|}

Legislative Council 

|}

Seats changing hands

 Members listed in italics did not recontest their seats.
 In addition, Labor retained the seat of Dandenong, which was won at a by-election.

Post-election pendulum

See also
Candidates of the 1970 Victorian state election

References

1970 elections in Australia
Elections in Victoria (Australia)
1970s in Victoria (Australia)
May 1970 events in Australia